Gokaran Prasad  was an Indian politician. He was a Member of Parliament, representing Misrikh , Uttar Pradesh in the Lok Sabha, the lower house of India's Parliament representing the Bharatiya Jana Sangh.

References

External links
Official biographical sketch in Parliament of India website

Rajya Sabha members from Uttar Pradesh
Bharatiya Jana Sangh politicians
1927 births
Possibly living people
India MPs 1962–1967